Herøy or Herøya may refer to:

Herøy, Møre og Romsdal, a municipality in Møre og Romsdal county, Norway
Herøy, Nordland, a municipality in Nordland county, Norway
Herøya, a suburb of the city of Porsgrunn in Telemark county, Norway
Herøy Church, a church in Herøy municipality in Møre og Romsdal county, Norway
Herøy Church (Nordland), a church in Herøy municipality in Nordland county, Norway
Herøya Church, a church in Porsgrunn municipality in Telemark county, Norway

See also 

 Heroy Clarke, Jamaican politician